Jackson Township is a township in Huntingdon County, Pennsylvania, United States. The population was 865 at the 2020 census. Greenwood Furnace State Park is a Pennsylvania state park in Jackson Township.

Geography

Demographics

As of the census of 2000, there were 882 people, 346 households, and 269 families residing in the township.  The population density was 12.2 people per square mile (4.7/km).  There were 675 housing units at an average density of 9.3/sq mi (3.6/km).  The racial makeup of the township was 98.30% White, 0.11% African American, 0.11% Asian, 0.45% from other races, and 1.02% from two or more races. Hispanic or Latino of any race were 0.34% of the population.

There were 346 households, out of which 28.9% had children under the age of 18 living with them, 67.6% were married couples living together, 5.8% had a female householder with no husband present, and 22.0% were non-families. 19.1% of all households were made up of individuals, and 7.5% had someone living alone who was 65 years of age or older.  The average household size was 2.55 and the average family size was 2.90.

In the township the population was spread out, with 23.1% under the age of 18, 5.7% from 18 to 24, 29.1% from 25 to 44, 29.9% from 45 to 64, and 12.1% who were 65 years of age or older.  The median age was 40 years. For every 100 females, there were 99.1 males.  For every 100 females age 18 and over, there were 101.2 males.

The median income for a household in the township was $43,875, and the median income for a family was $49,583. Males had a median income of $33,125 versus $26,125 for females. The per capita income for the township was $21,065.  About 3.3% of families and 3.6% of the population were below the poverty line, including none of those under age 18 and 13.7% of those age 65 or over.

References

Townships in Huntingdon County, Pennsylvania
Townships in Pennsylvania